Joyce Mbui, is a Kenyan  lawyer, who is a Partner at Coulson Harney LLP, a law firm, based in Nairobi, Kenya's capital city. Coulson Harney LLP, is a member of the Bowman Law Firm Network, headquartered in Johannesburg, South Africa, with offices in Cape Town, Dar es Salaam, Durban, Kampala and Nairobi.

Ms Joyce Mbui is qualified as an English solicitor of England and Wales as well as an advocate of the High Court of Kenya. She is a member of the Law Society of Kenya and the Law Society of England and Wales.

Background and education
Mbui was born circa 1986, in Kenya. She attended Precious Blood Girls High School, in the Riruta neighborhood of Nairobi, where she obtained her High School Diploma.

She was admitted to the University of Leicester, where she graduated with a Bachelor of Laws degree. She then enrolled in the Legal Practice Course at The Nottingham Trent University. Having passed that course, she was admitted to the English Bar.

She went on to obtain a Master of Science degree in Real Estate, from the University of Reading. Joyce Mbui is also a member of the Kenya Bar, having successfully completed the Advocates Training Programme, at the Kenya School of Law.

Work experience
Ms. Mbui started out in 2003 as a Customer Billing Representative
at British Gas, working in that capacity for two years. In 2009, she returned to Kenya and worked as a Legal Associate at Kaplan & Stratton, another Nairobi law firm, where she worked until 2011. In 2012, she joined Bowman as an associate attorney, working there for one year, before returning to the United Kingdom for further studies. In 2015, she was promoted to senior associate at Bowman Gilfillan Africa Group and posted to the group's headquarters in Johannesburg, South Africa. In 2018, she made Partner at Bowman and assigned to the group's office in Nairobi, Kenya (Coulson Harney LLP).

Joyce Mbui's expertise is corporate and commercial law, corporate financing, capital markets and restructuring. She was a member of the legal team that advised Kenya Airways (IATA:KQ) during the re-structuring in 2017. During that process, the government of Kenya and several Kenyan commercial banks converted several hundred million dollars worth of loans into equity, to allow KQ to continue operating as a going concern.

Other considerations
In September 2018, Joyce Mbui was named among the "Top 40 Women Under 40 in Kenya 2018", by the Business Daily Africa, an English language Kenyan daily newspaper.

See also
 Topyster Muga
 Emma Miloyo
 Cynthia Wandia

References

External links
Partial list of articles authored by Joyce Mbui

Living people
1986 births
21st-century Kenyan lawyers
Kenyan women lawyers
Alumni of the University of Leicester
Alumni of Nottingham Trent University
Kenya School of Law alumni
Alumni of the University of Reading